Jens Kristian Skogmo (born 16 July 1987) is a Norwegian football defender who plays for Askim.

Career
He started his career in Askim before joining Moss and Sprint-Jeløy. He then made his Tippeligaen debut on 13 March 2016 against Lillestrøm for Start.

Skogmo joined Arendal in January 2018. He left the club at the end of 2019. In 2021 he joined Askim.

Career statistics

References

1987 births
Living people
People from Askim
Norwegian footballers
Norway youth international footballers
Association football defenders
Moss FK players
SK Sprint-Jeløy players
Follo FK players
IK Start players
Arendal Fotball players
Eliteserien players
Norwegian First Division players
Sportspeople from Viken (county)